Mats Hellström (born 12 January 1942 in Stockholm) is a Swedish Social Democratic politician. He was Minister of Foreign Trade from 1983 to 1986, Minister for Agriculture from 1986 to 1991 and Minister of Foreign Trade again from 1994 to 1996.  He was the Swedish Ambassador to Germany from 1996 to 2001. He was the County Governor of Stockholm County between 2002 and 2006.

References

1942 births
Living people
Politicians from Stockholm
Swedish Social Democratic Party politicians
Governors of Stockholm County
County governors of Sweden
Ambassadors of Sweden to Germany
Articles containing video clips
Grand Crosses with Star and Sash of the Order of Merit of the Federal Republic of Germany
20th-century Swedish politicians
Swedish Ministers for Nordic Cooperation